Bonsack & Pearce was an architectural firm in St. Louis, Missouri in the United States. It was a partnership between  Frederick Charles Bonsack III and Harvey J. Pearce. Several of their buildings are listed on the National Register of Historic Places (NRHP).

Bonsack's father, also named Frederick C. Bosnack (1859 - 1917), was a builder and architect. Bosnack III worked at his father's firm and served in the U.S. Navy during World War I. He then partnered with Pearce.

Pearce's younger brother Robert joined the firm. After the younger Bonsack died in 1953 the firm became Pearce & Pearce.

Work
Masonic Temple (Kirksville, Missouri) (1927), NRHP listed
Wheatley Public School (1928) at 921 Garfield Street in Poplar Bluff, Missouri, NRHP listed
J. Milton Turner School at 238 Meacham Avenue and 245 Saratoga Avenue in Meacham Park, Kirkwood, Missouri, NRHP listed
Drs. George and Blanche Laughlin House  (1937), NRHP listed
Washington School (1937) at 529 South Locust Stret Monroe City, Missouri, NRHP listed
Audrain County Courthouse (1951) 101 N. Jefferson St. Mexico, MO , NRHP listed
Osage Hills School at 1110 Glenwood S, NRHP listed
Affton High School at 8520 Mackenzie Road in Affton, Missouri, NRHP listed

See also
National Register of Historic Places listings in St. Louis County, Missouri

References

Architecture of St. Louis
Defunct architecture firms of the United States